Fear Factor – Nieustraszeni is a Polish reality show, based on Fear Factor, produced by Endemol in 2004.

The series began airing on September 8, 2004, and the premiere episode was viewed by 2,69 mln viewers, (with 24.1% share in 16–49 group). The whole series have seen 2,5 mln viewers (in 16–49 group – 1,47 mln).

The day after the main episode (on Saturdays at 11:00 p.m.) Polsat was airing Fear Factor – Nieustraszeni. Poza cenzurą – which was showing scenes that could not be aired before 11:00 p.m.

Finalists

References 

Fear Factor
Polish reality television series
Polsat original programming
Television shows filmed in Poland
Television shows filmed in Argentina